Seared is a drama written by Theresa Rebeck set in a restaurant kitchen. Its world premiere was held at the San Francisco Playhouse in San Francisco, California in 2016. The production was directed by Margarett Perry, with Brian Dykstra in the leading role.

Plot
The play is set in the kitchen of a struggling restaurant, as the protagonist Harry meets a clash of wills in this drama of ideology versus money with his brother. Harry is chef who takes great pride in his cooking, working at a restaurant that is finally starting to see some success. When his business partner Mike brings in an outside consultant to help with the business, Harry finds the change more than he can handle.

Critical reception
Seared got positive reviews as the San Francisco Chronicle called it 'culinary drama done to perfection', praising the director and cast performance.

Mercury News had reviewed the play as being 'packed with clever dialogue...and a genuine love of food'. Their critic said that the play was much simpler in plot than Rebeck's other work, with no secrets or plot twists and no attempt to show the characters' lives outside work, despite clever dialog about the nature of authenticity and tension about whether the chef Harry will agree to changes.

Theatre Dogs gave it a glowing review, saying that "Seared turns out to be not unlike the dishes its chef creates: artfully made, crafted with the best possible ingredients and served with confident flair. That it’s so delicious and deeply satisfying makes it the haute cuisine of contemporary drama."

References

External links
 

2016 plays
American plays